Uncial 0246 (in the Gregory-Aland numbering), is a Greek uncial manuscript of the New Testament. Paleographically it has been assigned to the 6th century.

Description 

The codex contains a small part of the Epistle of James 1:12-14,19-21, on 1 parchment leaf (29 cm by 20 cm). Written in one columns per page, 27 lines per page, in uncial letters.
Survived leaf is not complete.

It is a palimpsest, the upper text has not survived to the present day (ink vanished).

Currently it is dated by the INTF to the 6th century.

Location 
Currently the codex is housed at the Westminster College (Mingana Georg. 7) in Cambridge.

Text 
The Greek text of this codex is a representative of the Byzantine text-type. Aland placed it in Category V.

See also 

 List of New Testament uncials
 Textual criticism

References 

Greek New Testament uncials
6th-century biblical manuscripts
Palimpsests
Manuscripts in Cambridge